The Five-Year Economic and Social Development Plans were an economic development project of South Korea.

Background
Both North and South Korea had survived the Korean War (1950–53). From the end of World War II, South Korea remained largely dependent on U.S. aid until a military coup occurred in 1961. American economic aid failed in its goal of creating an industrial base in South Korea largely thanks to corruption. While the South Koreans did not starve and were able to keep up with national defense, most of the aid was misappropriated for private use. This created a small class of wealthy Koreans at the expense of the majority of the country, generating resentment. Despite this widespread corruption however, the Syngman Rhee administration had managed to use some U.S. aid to develop the country's education system, transportation infrastructure, and communications infrastructure. This investment resulted in the South Korean population being well educated by the time the Park Chung-hee regime took over, with the infrastructure in place for rapid economic growth. In 1961, General Park Chung-hee seized political power and decided the country should become self-reliant by utilizing five-year plans.

Five-Year Plans
The plans were designed to increase wealth within South Korea and strengthen political stability. A change in policy from import substitution industrialization to export-oriented growth occurred throughout these five-year plans. South Korea had three five-year plans under the auspices of the Economic Planning Board, a state bureaucracy pilot agency.

1962–1966
The first plan sought to expand electrical/coal energy industry, emphasizing importance on the infrastructure for establishing a solid foundation, agricultural productivity, export, neutralize balance of payments, and promote technological advancements. These policies were established, along with further investments in education and other social resources, to shift the Korean economy further towards an export oriented one. As part of these shifts, the share of workers in agriculture steadily declined in exchange for more workers in manufacturing.

The Korean economy observed a 7.8% growth, exceeding expectations, while GNP per capita grew from 83 to 125 US dollars.

1967–1971
The second five-year plan sought to shift the South Korean state into heavy industry by making South Korea more competitive in the world market, which was incorporated into all future five-year plans. The industry was based on steel and petrochemical industry. The major highways were built for easier transportation.

U.S.-China's opening up in 1972 led to a greater competitive marketplace for South Korean goods and services. Fears also prevailed that the U.S. would no longer provide military defense for South Korea. By the end of the second 5-year plan, South Korea was able to double its GNP per capita.

1972–1976 
Park Chung-hee implemented the third five-year plan which was referred to as the Heavy Chemical Industrialization Plan (HCI Plan) and, also, the "Big Push". The HCI Plan designated 5 separate fields as "strategic fields": Electronics, Shipbuilding, Machinery, Petrochemicals, and Non-ferrous metals. Faced with escalating North Korean threats, a potentially uncertain ally in the United States, and the changing security arrangements regarding Okinawa, South Korean political leaders looked to use a heavy industry drive to lessen their military dependence on the United States and build up the Republic of Korea Armed Forces. To fund the HCIP, the government borrowed heavily from foreign countries (not foreign direct investment, so that it could direct its project).

1977–1981
By the time of the fourth plan, GNP per capita in 1977 was 1,000 US dollars. However, in 1978, because of price of goods, real estate speculation, lack of everyday necessities and various produce, etc., previously unaddressed problems began to arise. In 1979, the second oil shock pushed the Korean economy to harsher standards and in 1980, the Gwangju Democratization Movement, political turmoil, pessimistic foresight, and unmet goals all contributed towards a first minus in the Korean economy in years.

1982–1986
The Fifth Five-Year Economic and Social Development Plan (1982–86) sought to shift the emphasis away from heavy and chemical industries, to technology-intensive industries, such as precision machinery, electronics (televisions, videocassette recorders, and semiconductor-related products), and information. More attention was to be devoted to building high-technology products in greater demand on the world market.

1987–1991
The Sixth Five-Year Economic and Social Development Plan (1987–91) to a large extent continued to emphasize the goals of the previous plan. The government intended to accelerate import liberalization and to remove various types of restrictions and nontariff barriers on imports. These moves were designed to mitigate adverse effects, such as monetary expansion and delays in industrial structural adjustment, which can arise because of a large surplus of funds. Seoul pledged to continue phasing out direct assistance to specific industries and instead to expand manpower training and research and development in all industries, especially the small and medium-sized firms that had not received much government attention previously. Seoul hoped to accelerate the development of science and technology by raising the ratio of research and development investment from 2.4 percent of the GNP to over 3 percent by 1991.

1992–1996
The goal of the Seventh Five-Year Economic and Social Development Plan (1992–96), formulated in 1989, was to develop high-technology fields, such as microelectronics, new materials, fine chemicals, bioengineering, optics, and aerospace. Government and industry would work together to build high-technology facilities in seven provincial cities to better balance the geographic distribution of industry throughout South Korea.

See also
Economy of South Korea
New Community Movement
Five-year plans of other countries

References 

Source
Park, P.H.,2000 "A Reflection on the East Asian Development Model: Comparison of the South Korean and Taiwanese Experiences," Thailand, Japan, and the East Asian Development Model, edited by Frank-Jurgen Richter, pages 141-168

Economic history of South Korea
Five-year plans